Johann Jakob Wick (1522 – 14 August 1588) was a Protestant clergyman from Zürich.

Wick lived in the Zürich of Heinrich Bullinger, the successor of Huldrych Zwingli. He studied theology in Tübingen, and was pastor of Witikon, at the city hospital, and the Predigerkirche. Afterwards he was canon and second archdeacon at the Grossmünster. Wick is the collector of the Wickiana.

External links 
 Nachlass in der Zentralbibliothek Zürich

1522 births
1588 deaths
People from Zürich
Swiss Calvinist and Reformed theologians
16th-century Swiss people
16th-century Calvinist and Reformed theologians